There are many prizefighters with both professional boxing records and professional kickboxing records, including:

A 

 Dennis Alexio
 Christopher Algieri
 Hiromi Amada

B 

 Xhavit Bajrami
 Baker Barakat
 Mike Bernardo
 Jemyma Betrian
 Marc de Bonte
 Francois Botha
 Riddick Bowe
 Paul Briggs
 Shannon Briggs
 Curtis Bush
 Butterbean

C 

 Graciela Casillas
 Donald Cerrone
 Shane Chapman
 Chi In-jin
 Randall Cobb
 Roberto Cocco
 Carlos Condit
 Dale Cook
 Dewey Cooper
 Kit Cope
 César Córdoba

D 

 Lucian Danilencu
 Marcus Davis
 Daniel Dawson
 Troy Dorsey

E 

 Ben Edwards

F 

 Johann Fauveau
 Don Frye
 Kyotaro Fujimoto

G 

 Fredia Gibbs
 Konstantin Gluhov
 Rodney Glunder
 Denis Grachev
 Peter Graham
 Harut Grigorian

H 

 Regina Halmich
 Holly Holm
 Nieky Holzken
 Mark Hunt

J 

 Jomthong Chuwattana
 Dragan Jovanović

K 

 Kaoklai Kaennorsing
 Virgil Kalakoda
 Karapet Karapetyan
 Vitali Klitschko
 Albert Kraus
 Jörgen Kruth

L 

 Lamsongkram Chuwattana
 Jérôme Le Banner
 Artem Levin
 Jean-Claude Leuyer

M 

 Bruce Macfie
 Sergej Maslobojev
 Ray Mercer
 Mighty Mo
 Jarrell Miller
 Steve Moxon
 Zack Mwekassa

N 

 Miriam Nakamoto
 Antz Nansen 
 Yōsuke Nishijima
 K. J. Noons
 Jan Nortje
 Phil Nurse

O 

 Andy Ologun
 Henri van Opstal

P 

 John Wayne Parr
 Tosca Petridis
 Vince Phillips
 Marek Piotrowski
 Jens Pulver

R 

 Pelé Reid
 Alessandro Riguccini
 Lucia Rijker
 Tsotne Rogava
 Kevin Rosier
 Rick Roufus

S 

 Saenchai PKSaenchaimuaythaigym
 Saiyok Pumpanmuang
 Sam-A Kaiyanghadaogym
 Samart Payakaroon
 Samson Dutch Boy Gym
 Joe Schilling
 Ray Sefo
 Umar Semata
 Anderson Silva
 Sirimongkol Singwangcha
 Matt Skelton
 Maurice Smith
 Patrick Smith
 Andy Souwer
 Jason Suttie

T 

 Yoko Takahashi
 Gregory Tony

U 

 Perry Ubeda
 Alexander Ustinov

V 

 Rico Verhoeven
 Doug Viney

W 

 Nicolas Wamba
 James Warring
 Kazuhisa Watanabe
 Adam Watt
 Arthur Williams
 Carter Williams
 Don Wilson

Z 

 Pavel Zhuravlev
 Cătălin Zmărăndescu
 Henriques Zowa

See also

List of female boxers
List of male boxers
List of female kickboxers
List of male kickboxers
List of mixed martial artists with professional boxing records

References

External links

prizefighters
prizefighters